Roy Moss (born August 1929) was an American rockabilly singer.

Moss was born in Plainview, Arkansas, and was the cousin of governor Orville Chaney. Little is known of his childhood.

Moss began his career after meeting songwriter Jimmie Skinner, who got him a job at radio station WNOP. There he played regularly with the group The Country Partners. He began playing rockabilly music right as it began cresting in the mid-1950s, and around that time Elvis Presley helped him get a slot on the show Louisiana Hayride. Following this, Skinner managed to land Moss a contract with Mercury Records, and released a few singles in 1956 and 1958, which saw some regional success in the American South. He toured with Skinner and also worked with country musicians such as Pee Wee King, Cowboy Copas, and Ray Price. Moving to Detroit, he appeared on various televeision and radio programs.

His 1958 single "Juanita" was later covered by Dale Hawkins. At the end of the 1950s he withdrew from music and became a farmer in Tennessee. In 1994 he made a comeback, releasing an album on Eagle Records with guitarist Johnny Patterson.

Singles

References
[ Roy Moss] at Allmusic

1929 births
Living people
American country rock singers
American country singer-songwriters
Singer-songwriters from Arkansas
Country musicians from Arkansas